"Why Do I Always Get it Wrong?", written and composed by Brian Hodgson and John Beeby, was the 's entry at the Eurovision Song Contest 1989, performed by the sextet Live Report, led by Ray Caruana.

Composition
For the second year in a row, the UK entered a ballad at the Eurovision final. This song revolved around a man who took off running "where [his lover] won't find [him]", as they cause him to hurt, and leaving their presence for good is the only way to stop the pain. Crying out against his illogical love for the person who has treated him so badly, Caruana asks, "why do I always get it wrong?".

Selection process
Live Report won the right to perform at the contest, held in Lausanne, by winning the UK national final, A Song for Europe, where they were the sixth act to perform. For the second of four consecutive years, Live Report was picked via a nationwide telephone vote, receiving more than twice as many votes as the second-place finisher.

At Eurovision
At Lausanne, the song was performed seventh on the night, after 's Ingeborg Sergeant with "Door de wind", and before 's Britt Synnøve with "Venners nærhet". At the end of judging that evening, "Why Do I Always Get it Wrong?" took the second-place slot with 130 points. Norway,  and  all gave their 12-point designations to the UK that evening. Despite losing the contest by seven points to 's Riva with "Rock Me," the UK actually received the most sets of 12 point designations for the evening (Yugoslavia received the 12 points from four countries).

Charts
After Eurovision, the song placed at No. 73 on the UK Singles Chart, the lowest chart placing for a British runner-up Eurovision entry.

References

External links
 Lyrics from Diggiloo Thrush

Eurovision songs of the United Kingdom
Eurovision songs of 1989
1989 in the United Kingdom
1989 singles
Pop ballads
1989 songs